The Serbian Hockey League is the top league for ice hockey in Serbia.

Teams
The total number of teams varies from season to season, as certain clubs can't fill their senior teams due to lack of players or finances. Some clubs only participate in the junior sections.

Champions

until 1991 – Yugoslav Hockey League
1991–92 – SKHL Crvena zvezda
Federal Republic of Yugoslavia
1992–93 – SKHL Crvena zvezda
1993–94 – HK Partizan
1994–95 – HK Partizan
1995–96 – SKHL Crvena zvezda
1996–97 – SKHL Crvena zvezda
1997–98 – HK Vojvodina
1998–99 – HK Vojvodina
1999–2000 – HK Vojvodina
2000–01 – HK Vojvodina
2001–02 – HK Vojvodina
Serbia and Montenegro
2002–03 – HK Vojvodina
2003–04 – HK Vojvodina
2004–05 – SKHL Crvena zvezda
2005–06 – HK Partizan
Serbia
2006–07 – HK Partizan
2007–08 – HK Partizan
2008–09 – HK Partizan
2009–10 – HK Partizan
2010–11 – HK Partizan
2011–12 – HK Partizan
2012–13 – HK Partizan
2013–14 – HK Partizan
2014–15 – HK Partizan
2015–16 – HK Partizan
2016–17 – HK Beograd
2017–18 – SKHL Crvena zvezda
2018–19 – SKHL Crvena zvezda
2019–20 – SKHL Crvena zvezda
2020–21 – SKHL Crvena zvezda
2021–22 – HK Vojvodina

All-time champions

See also
Yugoslav Ice Hockey League
Panonian League
Slohokej League

External links
Serbian Ice Hockey Association, hockeyserbia.com
Slapshot Forum, hokejsrbija.org
Hokey na ledu u Srbiji, webng.com
hokej.rs, hockey.rs
Serbia Forum, internationalhockey.net

 
Top tier ice hockey leagues in Europe
1